Catarina de Lemos Wallenstein (born 23 August 1986) is a Portuguese actress. She has appeared in more than twenty films since 2004.

Biography
Wallenstein was born in London, daughter of Pedro Franco Wallenstein Teixeira, double bass player of the Portuguese Symphonic Orchestra, and Lúcia de Castro Cardoso de Lemos, a lyric singer. Her family settled in Lisbon when she was still a child. On the paternal side, she is the granddaughter of the poet and actor Carlos Wallenstein and the actress, teacher and director Maria Wallenstein and niece of the actor José Wallenstein. She studied at the Lisbon Theatre and Film School.

She joined the choir of the Children's Music Foundation, where she also studied cello and choral singing. The same foundation led her to participate in the children's ensembles of operas such as Tosca, La Bohème, Carmen, in the National Theatre of Saint Charles.

Selected filmography

Awards and nominations

References

External links

1986 births
Living people
Actresses from London
Portuguese people of German descent
Portuguese film actresses
Portuguese voice actresses
Actresses from Lisbon
Catarina
Lisbon Theatre and Film School alumni
21st-century Portuguese actresses
21st-century English women
21st-century English people